Each country's final squad has to comprise 21 players. The final squads were confirmed by FIFA on 3 August 2022.

Group A

Australia
A preliminary squad was called up on 18 July 2022 for a pre-tournament camp in Mexico. The final squad was announced on 1 August 2022.

Head coach: Leah Blayney

Brazil
The squad was announced on 27 July 2022. On 1 August 2022, Gio Queiroz withdrew and was replaced by Mileninha.

Head coach: Jonas Urias

Costa Rica
A 24-player preliminary squad was announced on 26 July 2022. The final 21-player squad was announced in August 2022. On 6 August 2022, Yirlany Hernández withdrew due to injury.

Head coach:  José Catoya

Spain
The final squad was announced on 13 July 2022. On 31 July 2022, Elene Lete withdrew due to injury and was replaced by Jana Xin

Head coach: Pedro López

Group B

Colombia
The final 21-player squad was announced on 2 August 2022.

Head coach:

Germany
A 23-player preliminary squad was announced on 14 July 2022. The final 21-player squad was announced on 1 August 2022.

Head coach: Kathrin Peter

Mexico
The final squad was announced on 2 August 2022.

Head coach: Ana Galindo

New Zealand
The squad was announced on 26 July 2022. Kate Duncan withdrew due to injury.

Head coach:  Gemma Lewis

Group C

Canada
The squad was announced on 22 July 2022.

Head coach: Cindy Tye

France
The squad was announced on 18 July 2022.

Head coach: Sonia Haziraj

Nigeria
A 30-player preliminary squad was announced on 25 June 2022. The final squad was announced in August 2022.

Head coach: Christopher Danjuma

South Korea
The final squad was announced on 14 July 2022.

Head coach: Hwang In-sun

Group D

Ghana
A 23-player preliminary squad was announced on 26 July 2022. The final 21-player squad was announced in August 2022.

Head coach: Ben Fokuo

Japan
A preliminary squad was announced on 4 July 2022. The final squad was announced on 12 July 2022. On 27 July 2022, Akari Takeshige withdrew due to injury and was replaced by Manaka Hayashi.

Head coach: Futoshi Ikeda

Netherlands
The final squad was announced on 22 July 2022.

Head coach: Jessica Torny

United States
The squad was announced on 25 July 2022. On August 11, 2022, Sally Menti withdrew due to injury and was replaced by Annie Karich.

Head coach:  Tracey Kevins

References

FIFA U-20 Women's World Cup squads